The 2008 season is the 86th season of competitive football in Ecuador.

National leagues

Serie A

Champion: Deportivo Quito (3rd title)
International cup qualifiers:
Copa Libertadores: Deportivo Quito, Deportivo Cuenca, El Nacional
Copa Sudamericana: Deportivo Quito
Relegated: Universidad Católica, Deportivo Azogues

Serie B
Winner: Manta (1st title)
Promoted: Manta, LDU Portoviejo
Relegated: LDU Cuenca, Brasilia

Segunda
Winner: Rocafuerte
Promoted: Rocafuerte, Atlético Audaz

Clubs in international competitions

National team

Senior team

2010 FIFA World Cup qualifiers

Friendlies

Women's U-20 team
The women's U-20 team participated in the South American Women's U-20 tournament in Brazil. They were drawn into Group A and finished third in the group; they failed to advance.

External links
Official website of the Ecuadorian football federation  
2008 season on RSSSF

 
2008